Ronald Vannucci Jr. (born February 15, 1976) is an American musician, best known for being the drummer for the rock band the Killers. Vannucci is also involved in a side project called Big Talk, and became the drummer of the Rentals in 2018.

Early life 
Ronald Vannucci Jr. was born in Las Vegas to an American couple with Italian, French, and German ancestry. Vannucci began drumming at the age of six. He was a part of his junior high school's jazz ensemble and later attended both Clark and Western High Schools. Vannucci played in various local bands. His first band was Purple Dirt.

Vannucci drummed for several local bands, including ska-punk group Attaboy Skip, who enjoyed regional success in the mid-1990s and featured Branden Campbell (of Neon Trees); Free Food, a cover band who played at prisons and homeless shelters in the Las Vegas area; and Expert On October, a band that also included Ted Sablay and Taylor Milne (of Big Talk).

Career

The Killers (2002–present) 

Vannucci studied classical percussion at UNLV, while also working as a photographer at Chapel of the Flowers, a wedding chapel on Las Vegas Boulevard. He was performing with a local group, Romance Fantasy, when he met Brandon Flowers and Dave Keuning, who had recently begun performing as the Killers. He joined the Killers in August 2002. The band would practice at Vannucci's garage, and he would also sneak the band into the Alta Ham Fine Arts Building at UNLV at night to practice. He later completed his bachelor's degree at UNLV on May 14, 2011, while the Killers were on hiatus. The Killers have released six consecutive No. 1 albums in the United Kingdom, sold over 22 million records worldwide, and have been nominated for seven Grammy Awards and seven BRIT Awards.

Big Talk (2011–present) 
Vannucci recorded a side project album during 2010–2011 and titled it Big Talk, aiming with tongue-in-cheek at the abundance of music being put out by labels before it is being fully prepared. NME named the eponymous album #24 on its Best Albums of 2011 list. Big Talk was mixed by Alan Moulder and recorded at Battle Born Studios with Joe Chiccarelli as producer. Matt Sharp (of Weezer and the Rentals) and long time friend Taylor Milne were enlisted to help record the album. Little Oil / Epitaph Records released the album on July 12, 2011. Big Talk was preceded by a single, "Getaways", on May 10, 2011. Vannucci was listed at #49 on NME's Cool List of 2011.

In 2015, Big Talk released their sophomore album, Straight In No Kissin'.

Other projects 
Vannucci has also contributed to Mt. Desolation, a side project of Keane members Tim Rice-Oxley and Jessie Quin, on acoustic guitar and percussion, and has also contributed to fellow Killers member, Brandon Flowers.

Playing style 
Vannucci mainly plays with his kit set up using a jazz technique with a high stool and hitched-up snare stand. He attributes this to his 6 ft 1 frame, a former teacher who whipped him, and the examples of great drummers including Mitch Mitchell and many jazz performers.

Vannucci is known for crashing his hi-hats, skillful sixteenth notes, and a fluid playing style. Drummer Magazine labels them a "few distinctive hallmarks [that] help characterize Ronnie's style".

Vannucci and his bandmate, bass guitarist Mark Stoermer, have what they consider a rewarding relationship musically. Of Stoermer, Vannucci has said, "He almost intuitively knows what I am going to play and his parts are so rhythmic it's a joy to dance around him I really enjoy thinking up parts with him. . . it works very well for us."

Vannucci was featured on the cover of Rhythm Magazine in October 2006, (where he was dubbed "pop's dynamic showman") and again in November 2008 and October 2012. He was also featured on Drummer Magazine in June 2009 and Modern Drummer Magazine in 2013. He was featured in Modern Drummer Magazine in March 2009 and in Drumhead Magazine, September 2008 and again in October 2008.

Influences 
Vannucci cites influences such as jazz legend Papa Jo Jones, Mitch Mitchell of the Jimi Hendrix Experience, Keith Moon of the Who, and John Bonham of Led Zeppelin. He also lists as influences the Cure, U2, Depeche Mode and more modern drummers including Charley Drayton, Steve Jordan, and Ahmir Thompson.

Equipment 

Vannucci currently uses Craviotto drums, DW pedals and hardware, Remo heads and Istanbul Agop cymbals. Vannuci previously endorsed and used Zildjian cymbals.

His current set-up is as follows:
Cymbals
 15" 30th Anniversary Hi-Hats
 22" Traditional Medium Crash
 22" Traditional Dark Crash
 24" Joey Waronker Ride (or a 24" 30th Anniversary Ride)
 22" Traditional Swish Cymbal (with rivets)

Drums
 9x13 Rack Tom
 16x16 Floor Tom
 16x18 Floor Tom
 7x14 Snare
 15x24 Bass Drum

Personal life 
Vannucci married Lisa Ann Yoakum on May 2, 2003. They had one pet dog, a boxer named Archie. Archie gained notoriety during the recording of Big Talk due to Vannucci's frequently tweeted pictures of him in the studio. He also enjoys ranching in his free time. Vannucci and Yoakum divorced in 2016.

Vannucci married Olivia Peloubet on October 7, 2017. They live in Pebble Beach, California.

Discography

Big Talk albums 
Big Talk (2011)
Straight In No Kissin' (2015)

Other appearances 
"Departure" – Mt. Desolation (2010)
"Midnight Ghost" – Mt. Desolation (2010)
"Playing with Fire" – Brandon Flowers (2010)
"Untangled Love" – Brandon Flowers (2015)

Awards and accolades 

University of Nevada Las Vegas College of Fine Arts Alumnus of the Year and Hall of Fame Inductee (2014)
Modern Drummers Reader Poll (2007) – Winner
Modern Drummers Reader Poll (2006) – Winner

References

External links 

The Killers official site, from Island Records

1976 births
American rock drummers
Living people
Musicians from Nevada
People from the Las Vegas Valley
The Killers members
The Rentals members
American people of German descent
American people of French descent
American people of Italian descent
American male drummers
20th-century American drummers
21st-century American drummers
Mt. Desolation members
Big Talk members
Western High School (Nevada) alumni